is a former Japanese football (soccer) player. He was a defender.

Career
After many seasons with Avispa Fukuoka and just one year with Kagoshima United FC, Tsutsumi opted to retire in January 2020.

Career statistics

Club
Updated to 23 February 2020.

*Includes other competitive competitions, including the A3 Champions Cup.

International

Appearances in major competitions

Awards and honours

Club
Urawa Red Diamonds
J. League Division 1: 1
 2006
Emperor's Cup: 2
 2005, 2006
AFC Champions League: 1
 2007
Japanese Super Cup: 1
 2006

References

External links

Profile at Avispa Fukuoka
Yahoo! Sports Profile 

1987 births
Living people
Association football people from Saitama Prefecture
Japanese footballers
J1 League players
J2 League players
Urawa Red Diamonds players
Roasso Kumamoto players
Tochigi SC players
Avispa Fukuoka players
Kagoshima United FC players
Association football defenders